The 1964 NAIA men's basketball tournament was held in March at Municipal Auditorium in Kansas City, Missouri. The 27th annual NAIA basketball tournament featured 32 teams playing in a single-elimination format. It was the first time the leading rebounder was also the leading scorer, Lucious Jackson of runner-up Pan American (Texas). Lucious was also named tournament Most Valuable Player, which made him the third player to receive the award back to back.

Awards and honors
Leading scorer: Lucious Jackson, Pan American; 5 games, 54 field goals, 16 free throws, 124 total points (24.8 points per game)
Leading rebounder: Lucious Jackson, Pan American; 5 games, 67 rebounds (13.4 rebounds per game)
Player of the Year: est. 1994
Most rebounds; career ends: 180, Lucious Jackson, Pan American, (1962,63,64)
All-time leading scorer; final appearance: Lucious Jackson, 7th Pan American (1962,63,64); 12 games, 117 field goals, 67 free throws, 301 total points, 25.0 average per game and Willis Reed, 16th Grambling (La.) (1961,63,64); 12 games 108 field goals 39 free throws 265 total points, 22.8 average per.

1964 NAIA bracket

  * denotes overtime.

Third-place game
The third-place game featured the losing teams from the national semifinalist to determine 3rd and 4th places in the tournament. This game was played until 1988.

See also
 1964 NCAA University Division basketball tournament
 1964 NCAA College Division basketball tournament

References

NAIA Men's Basketball Championship
Tournament
NAIA men's basketball tournament
NAIA men's basketball tournament
College basketball tournaments in Missouri
Basketball competitions in Kansas City, Missouri